Sulabha Kashinath Kulkarni (born 1 June 1949 in Pune, Maharashtra) is an Indian physicist, whose research spans the areas of Nanotechnology, Materials Science, and Surface Science. She is currently a visiting faculty member at Indian Institute of Science Education and Research, Pune, India.

Early life and education 
Born in 1949, Kulkarni was educated in Pune and earned her Bachelor of Science (1969), Master of Science (1971), and Doctor of Philosophy (1976) in Physics from the University of Pune. From 1976 to 1977, she conducted her post-doctoral research on gas/solid interactions using surface science techniques in the Physics Department (E20) at Technical University, Munich, Germany.

Work and career 
Kulkarni joined as a faculty member in the Department of Physics at the University of Pune upon her return to India. She continued to research and teach for 32 years, also introducing a course on Nanotechnology at the post-graduate level. In March 2009, she joined the Indian Institute of Science Education and Research (IISER) in Pune and continued as a UGC scientist. From 2010 to 2011, she served as Pro Vice Chancellor at the Banasthali University, Rajasthan. She returned to IISER Pune as UGC Professor and is currently a Visiting Faculty at IISER Pune.

Awards and honors 
 Associate editor, Journal of Nanophotonics (2011- )
 Fellow (FNA), Indian National Science Academy (New Delhi) (2011- )
 Bharatiya Stree Shakti "Women and Technological Innovation National Award (2007)
 Associate editor, International Journal of Nanoscience & Nanotechnology (2006- )
 Fellow (FASc), Indian Academy of Science (Bangalore) (2004– )
 Fellow (FNASc), National Academy of Sciences, India (Allahabad), (2003– )
 Elected President, IPA Pune Chapter (1996–1998)
 Fellow, Maharashtra Academy of Sciences (1995- )

References

Academic staff of the Indian Institute of Science Education and Research, Pune
Women scientists from Maharashtra
Indian women physicists
Fellows of the Indian Academy of Sciences
1949 births
Living people
20th-century Indian women scientists
21st-century Indian women scientists
21st-century Indian physicists
20th-century Indian physicists
Indian condensed matter physicists
Indian nanotechnologists